Sumbat Saakian (1951–1993) was an ethnic Armenian politician in the Government of Abkhazian Autonomous Republic who was killed in Sukhumi along with Zhiuli Shartava, Guram Gabiskiria and others by Abkhaz separatist rebels during the Sukhumi massacre on September 27, 1993.

See also 
Sukhumi massacre

External links
Government of Abkhazia
 (right-click to open file)

Abkhaz–Georgian conflict
1993 deaths
Abkhazian politicians
1951 births
Abkhazian murder victims
Abkhaz Armenians